Limit or Limits may refer to:

Arts and media
 Limit (manga), a manga by Keiko Suenobu
 Limit (film), a South Korean film
 Limit (music), a way to characterize harmony
 "Limit" (song), a 2016 single by Luna Sea
 "Limits", a 2019 song by Paenda; see Austria in the Eurovision Song Contest 2019
 Limits (collection), a collection of short stories and essays by Larry Niven
 The Limit, a Dutch band
The Limit, an episode from The Amazing World of Gumball

Mathematics
 Limit (mathematics), the value that a function or sequence "approaches" as the input or index approaches some value
 Limit of a function
(ε,_δ)-definition of limit, formal definition of the mathematical notion of limit
 Limit of a sequence
 One-sided limit, either of the two limits of a function as a specified point is approached from below or from above
 Limit of a net
 Limit point, in topological spaces
 Limit (category theory)
 Direct limit
 Inverse limit

Other uses
 Limits (BDSM), activities that a partner feels strongly about, and to which special attention is paid
 limits.h, the header of a general purpose standard library of the C programming language
 Els Límits, a village in the municipality of La Jonquera, Catalonia
 Limit order, a type of order to buy a security at no more (or sell at no less) than a specific price on an exchange
 Speed limit, the maximum speed at which road vehicles may legally travel on particular stretches of road
 Setting limits, a life skill for protecting against having personal values compromised or violated
 A concept developed by Eugenio Trías: Being is the being of limit

See also
 
 Limited (disambiguation)
 Limitation (disambiguation)
 Limitless (disambiguation)
 Unlimited (disambiguation)
 No Limits (disambiguation)